The Arms Dealer's Daughter, an album by Shooglenifty, was released in 2003 on the Compass Records label.

Track listing
 "Glenuig Hall/The Wrong Box" – 5:00
 "The Arms Dealer's Daughter/Aye Right" – 6:52
 "Heading West" – 5:10
 "Missed the Bypass/The Reid St. Sofa/Fit're Ye Dain, Up Ma Vennel?!" – 5:22
 "The Nordal Rumba" – 5:12
 "Bar Bruno's/Maxine's Polka" – 4:33
 "A Fistful of Euro/The New Rat, No. 6" – 6:23
 "Carboni's Farewell/The Patient Man" – 7:02
 "Scraping the Barrel/Fielding's Possum/Take the Tunnel" – 5:36
 "Tune for Bartley" – 6:36

Sources and links

References

Shooglenifty albums
2003 albums